Oleksandr Mykolayovich (or Aleksandr Nikolayevich) Tkachenko (born 24 January 1947 in Kupiansk) is a retired Soviet football player and a current Ukrainian coach.

Honours
 Soviet Top League winner: 1972.

International career
Tkachenko made his debut for USSR on 29 June 1972 in a friendly against Uruguay.

References
  Profile

1947 births
Living people
People from Kupiansk
Soviet footballers
Soviet Union international footballers
FC Zenit Saint Petersburg players
FC Zorya Luhansk players
FC Shakhtar Stakhanov players
Soviet Top League players
Ukrainian footballers
Ukrainian football managers
FC Shakhtar Stakhanov managers
Association football goalkeepers
Sportspeople from Kharkiv Oblast